Kilmood is a civil parish in County Down, Northern Ireland. It is situated in the historic barony of Castlereagh Lower.

Townlands
The civil parish contains the following townlands:

Ballybunden and Kilmood
Ballygraffan
Ballykeel
Ballyministragh
Drumhirk
Kilmood and Ballybunden
Lisbarnet
Tullynagee

See also
List of civil parishes of County Down

References